Hermione is a feminine given name derived from the Greek messenger god Hermes. Hermione was the daughter of Menelaus and Helen in Greek mythology. It was also the name of an early Christian martyr, Hermione of Ephesus, and of a character in William Shakespeare’s play The Winter's Tale. Usage of the name has increased in recent years in part due to a character in the Harry Potter series by J.K. Rowling.

People
Hermione of Ephesus (died 117 A.D.), an early Christian martyr
Hermione Baddeley (1906–1986), English actress
Hermione Cobbold (1905–2004), British matriarch
Hermione Cockburn (born 1973), British TV and radio presenter
Hermione Cock (1904–2015), British female supercentenarian
Hermione Corfield (born 1993), English actress and model
Hermione Darnborough, (1915–2010), English ballerina
Hermione Eyre (born 1980), British journalist and novelist
Hermione FitzGerald (born 1985), Irish professional golfer
Hermione Farthingale (born 1949), English dancer and yoga teacher who was an ex-girlfriend of David Bowie and inspired his songs Letter to Hermione and Life on Mars 
Hermione Gingold (1897–1987), English actress
Hermione Gulliford, English actress
Hermione Hammond (1910–2005), English painter
Hermione Hannen (1913–1983), English actress
Hermione Harvey (1931–2016), English actress and dancer
Hermione (Hennessy) Ross (born 1966), British singer-songwriter
Hermione Ruth Herrick (1889–1983), New Zealand Guide leader and women's naval administrator
Hermione Hobhouse (1934–2014), British architectural historian
Hermione Hoby (born 1985), British author, journalist, and cultural critic 
Hermione Kitson (born 1984), Australian news presenter and reporter 
Hermione Lee (born 1948), British biographer and critic
Hermione Norris (born 1967), English actress
Hermione Cronje, South African prosecutor
Hermione Wiltshire (born 1963), English photographer
Hermione, Countess of Ranfurly (1913–2001), British author
Hermione von Preuschen (1854–1918), German painter and author
Hermione Underwood, Australian actress
Hermione FitzGerald (1864–1895), Duchess of Leinster
Hermione Lambton (1906–1990), Countess of Durham
Hermione Lister-Kaye (born 1990), British naturalist and journalist, daughter of John Lister-Kaye
Hermione Shirley (1891–1969), Countess Ferrers
Hermione Rogers (1895–1917), British nurse who died when the HMS Osmanieh was torpedoed
Hermione Peters (born 1994), Belgian canoeist
Hermione Asachi (1821–1900), Romanian writer and translator

Fictional characters
 Hermione (mythology), the daughter of Menelaus and Helen in Greek mythology
 Hermione Bostock, a character in the fiction of P. G. Wodehouse
 Hermione Granger, a main character in the Harry Potter novels and films
 Hermione Gravell-Pitt, a character in the novel Around the World with Auntie Mame
 Hermione Herman, the sister of Pee-wee Herman
 Hermione Lodge, a character in the Archie Comics and in the Netflix series Riverdale (2017 TV series)
 Hermione Makepeace (Minnie the Minx), comic strip character from The Beano
 Hermione, a male character in the 1582 court drama The Rare Triumphs of Love and Fortune
 Hermione Montego, a character in the 1966 episode of Batman (TV series), "The Thirteenth Hat".
 Hermione Pennistone, the main character in the 1932 novel Marriage of Hermione by Richmal Crompton
 Hermione Seymour, the main character in the 1791 novel Hermione, or the Orphan Sister by Charlotte Lennox
 Hermione Shotover, a character in the play Heartbreak House of G. B. Shaw
 Hermione Trumpington-Bonnet, a character in the British TV series Monarch of the Glen
 Hermione, a character in the novel Atonement by Ian McEwan
 Hermione, a character in the novel Women in Love by D.H. Lawrence
 Hermione, a character based on the mythological Harmonia in the opera Cadmus et Hermione by Jean-Baptiste Lully
 Hermione Morton, a character in the British TV series Ripper Street
 Hermione de Borromeo, a character in the Japanese animated TV series Romeo x Juliet
 Hermione, Queen of Sicily, a character in the play The Winter's Tale by William Shakespeare
 Aunt Hermione, a character in the BBC TV Series The Durrells played by Barbara Flynn
 Hermione Gart, an autobiographical character in the novel HERmione by H.D.
 Hermione Bagwa, a character in Star Wars: Episode II – Attack of the Clones

See also

Hermine (disambiguation)
Hermes

References

Greek feminine given names
Given names of Greek language origin
Feminine given names